First Congregational Free Church is a historic church at 177 N. Main Street in Oriskany Falls, Oneida County, New York.  It is a limestone structure started in 1833 and completed in 1845.  It features a low gable roof surmounted by a tower consisting of a belfry and slender spire.

It was listed on the National Register of Historic Places in 1979.

References

Churches on the National Register of Historic Places in New York (state)
Churches completed in 1845
19th-century churches in the United States
Churches in Oneida County, New York
National Register of Historic Places in Oneida County, New York
Congregational churches in New York (state)